Idraki Adnan (born 13 March 1999) is a Singaporean footballer currently playing as a midfielder for Hougang United.

Club career

Hougang United
In 2021, Idraki returned to Hougang United after playing for Young Lions FC in 2020.

Career statistics

Club

Notes

International statistics

U19 International caps

U19 goals
Scores and results list Singapore's goal tally first.

References

Living people
1999 births
Singaporean footballers
Association football midfielders
Singapore Premier League players